

Results of individual events
The tables below are medalists of individual events (men's and women's singles, men's and women's doubles and mixed).

Men's singles

Medal table

Women's singles

The champion of women's singles in 1937 was declared vacant due to time limit rule in force at the time. In 2001, it was decided to declare the two finalists co-champions.

Medal table

Men's doubles

Medal table

Women's doubles

Medal table

Mixed doubles

Medal table

Results of team events
The tables below are medalists of team events.

Men's team

Performance by nations in men's team

Women's team

Performance by nations in women's team

References
ITTF Statistics
ITTF Museum

Lists of table tennis players
Table Tennis World Championships